Margaret Harris Comprehensive School (MHCS) is a special education school for grades PreK-12 in North Druid Hills in unincorporated DeKalb County, Georgia, United States. It is a part of the DeKalb County School District.

It was previously called Margaret Harris High School for Exceptional Children, and was a non-academic ungraded special education program center for disabled students of 14 to 21 years of age.

References

External links
 
 Profile at DeKalb County School District

Schools in DeKalb County, Georgia